Bojan Pandžić (born 13 March 1982) is a Swedish football referee. Pandžić currently resides in Hisings Backa, part of Gothenburg. He has been a full international referee for FIFA since 2014. He became a professional referee in 2004 and has been an Allsvenskan referee since 2009. Pandzic has refereed 165 matches in Allsvenskan, 65 matches in Superettan and 8 international matches as of 2014.

See also 

 List of football referees

References

External links 
FIFA
SvFF

1982 births
Living people
Swedish people of Serbian descent
Swedish football referees